Ultrasaurus (meaning "ultra lizard") is a genus of sauropod dinosaur discovered by Haang Mook Kim in South Korea. However, the name was first used unofficially (as a nomen nudum) in 1979 by Jim Jensen to describe a set of giant dinosaur bones he discovered in the United States. Because Kim published the name for his specimen before Jensen could do so officially, Jensen renamed his specimen Ultrasauros. Jensen's giant sauropod was later found to be a chimera, and the type remains are now assigned to Supersaurus.

Mistaken assessments
A collection of bones discovered by Jim Jensen, of Brigham Young University, at the Dry Mesa Quarry, Colorado were originally believed to belong to the largest dinosaur ever. Jensen informally called this supposedly new dinosaur "Ultrasaurus", and this name was widely used by the press and in scientific literature as a nomen nudum (informal name lacking an actual scientific description).

In 1983, Kim Hang-mook published a paper describing a different specimen representing a new dinosaur species, which he named Ultrasaurus tabriensis, because he believed it was an equally giant relative of Jensen's dinosaur. However, Kim's assessment was incorrect. His dinosaur was much smaller than he believed, because he mistook a partial humerus for an ulna. However, since Kim was the first to publish the name Ultrasaurus, the name officially applied to the small South Korean sauropod, and could no longer be used as an official name for Jensen's giant specimen.

Jensen published a paper describing his original discovery in 1985, but since the name Ultrasaurus was already in use (or "preoccupied"), his discovery was renamed in 1991 to Ultrasauros. However, Jensen also made a mistake. His discovery was a chimera; the collection of fossils came from two different dinosaur species, both of which already had names. So his new name, Ultrasauros, is now just an alternate name (junior synonym) for the dinosaur officially known as Supersaurus.

Description
Ultrasaurus lived 100 to 110 million years ago, during the Aptian and Albian stages of the Early Cretaceous. It is known from the holotype DGBU-1973, which consists of part of an upper forearm (humerus), and some back bones (vertebrae) from the Gugyedong Formation, belonging to the Hayang Group.

Classification
Kim's Ultrasaurus is currently a nomen dubium. Not enough is known about the specimen to formally assign it to a specific family of sauropods. It may even be a member of a known genus or species, which would make the name Ultrasaurus a junior synonym as well.

References 

Sauropods
Albian life
Early Cretaceous dinosaurs of Asia
Cretaceous South Korea
Fossils of South Korea
Fossil taxa described in 1983
Nomina dubia